Ehtesham Ali Khan (born 15 July 1965) is an Indian former cricketer. He played 44 first-class matches for Hyderabad between 1984 and 1992.

See also
 List of Hyderabad cricketers

References

External links
 

1965 births
Living people
Indian cricketers
Hyderabad cricketers
Cricketers from Hyderabad, India